The Buchbach is a river in Baden-Württemberg, Germany. It is a headstream of the Speltach.

See also
List of rivers of Baden-Württemberg

References

Rivers of Baden-Württemberg
Rivers of Germany